The Kunandaburi or Karendala (Garandala) were an indigenous Australian people of the state of Queensland.

Country
These covered areas like Cooper Creek, and Durham Downs, and their northern limits lay around Mount Howitt. Their eastern frontier was at Plevna Downs, the McGregor Range, and in the vicinity of Eromanga.

Alternative names
 ? Kurnanda-buri
 Kunanda-buri

Notes

Citations

Sources

Aboriginal peoples of Queensland